The Karlsö Islands are two small Swedish Baltic Sea islands close to Gotland:
 Lilla Karlsö
 Stora Karlsö